Jeffery (originally titled No, My Name is Jeffery) is the fourth commercial mixtape by American rapper Young Thug. It was released for retail purchase on August 26, 2016, by 300 Entertainment and Atlantic Records. The mixtape features guest appearances from Travis Scott, Gucci Mane, Gunna, Quavo & Offset of Migos, and Wyclef Jean. It also features production from TM88, Wheezy, and Young Thug himself (credited as his first name/album namesake Jeffery).

Jeffery charted at number eight on the US Billboard 200, and received widespread acclaim from critics. Its artwork, which features Young Thug in a dress, went viral. The mixtape was named among the best releases of 2016 by several publications, including Pitchfork, Fact, Complex, and Rolling Stone.

Background
Jeffery was announced on July 9, 2016, via Young Thug's Instagram, along with previews of new music. It was initially slated for release on August 16, coinciding with Young Thug's birthday, but was pushed back. The mixtape was accompanied by his decision to abandon the stage name Young Thug in favor of the new moniker No, My Name is Jeffery, or simply his birth name Jeffery. The change of stage name was announced by his manager Lyor Cohen in the preparation for the mixtape's release. According to Young Thug, "Jeffery is all about Jeffery. It ain't even about Young Thug. Ain't no Young Thug songs on there. The mixtape is a straight crossover". On Beats 1, he clarified that the name change was only for one week, unless the mixtape sold 100,000 copies.

With the exception of "Pick Up the Phone", each track was named after one of Young Thug's idols, including Gucci Mane ("Guwop"), Wyclef Jean ("Wyclef Jean"), Rihanna ("RiRi"), Future ("Future Swag"), Harambe, the gorilla killed at the Cincinnati Zoo in May 2016, and Kanye West ("Kanye West").

Artwork
The project artwork features Young Thug in an androgynous dress designed by Italian designer Alessandro Trincone, and was photographed by Garfield Lamond. The artwork went viral and prompted a wide range of responses on social media.

Release and promotion
The song "Kanye West" (originally titled "Elton" and then later "Pop Man") featuring Wyclef Jean, was released on August 19, 2016. The mixtape release was then preceded by a short album trailer released on August 23, which depicted Young Thug being interrogated about his name by the authorities.

The mixtape's lead single, "Pick Up the Phone" featuring American rappers Travis Scott and Quavo, was released on June 3, 2016, the song peaked at number 43 on the US Billboard Hot 100. "Wyclef Jean" was sent to urban contemporary radio on January 24, 2017, as the mixtape's second single, it peaked at number 87 on the Billboard Hot 100.

Critical reception

Jeffery was met with widespread critical acclaim. At Metacritic, which assigns a normalized rating out of 100 to reviews from mainstream publications, the mixtape received an average score of 82, based on 11 reviews. Aggregator AnyDecentMusic? gave it 7.4 out of 10, based on their assessment of the critical consensus.

AllMusic's Neil Z. Yeung called the mixtape "thrilling and essential, one of the best rap releases of 2016", writing that "there's enough freshness here to make it his most exciting and mainstream release to date". Daniel Bromfield from Pretty Much Amazing described it as "a more satisfying major-label rap album than most mixtape-bred rappers ever make", asserting that "despite being more extreme in many ways than his prior work, Jeffery is his poppiest tape since 2014's Tha Tour with Rich Gang". PopMatters critic Brian Duricy stated that "as a collection of songs, it's his most realized set to date". Rolling Stones Jody Rosen stated that "it's Thug's own sound that predominates: the heroic howls, rasps, mumbles and wheezes of a man who is as captivating a vocalist as any in pop".

For MTV News, Meaghan Garvey wrote that "Jeffery, like  ATLiens 20 years prior, has that unqualifiable, absolute feeling of arrival", describing it as "irrepressible, bursting with uncannily memorable one-liners and dynamic experiments in flow and cadence over beats that, attached to a more easily marketable rapper, could be obvious radio hits". Pitchforks Sheldon Pearce described it as "rangy and stunning, an exciting new curve in the fascinating Young Thug arc", stating that "Thug understands the modern pop song construction better than anyone: anything and everything can be a hook". Robert Christgau wrote in Vice that Young Thug "makes black comedy out of irrepressible sound", stating that "his hoohoos and melismas and blahs and mwas and frogcroaks and put-puts are the message". In a less enthusiastic review, Lanre Bakare of The Guardian described it as "a mixtape that features gems among run-of-the-mill trap fodder" while praising the single "Pick Up the Phone" as "an example of all the things Young Thug excels at coming together on one track".

Year-end lists

Commercial performance
Jeffery debuted at number eight on the US Billboard 200 and number five on the US Top R&B/Hip-Hop Albums, with 37,000 album-equivalent units and sold 18,000 copies in its first week. This is Thug's third debut in the top 40 and his second in the top 10.

Track listing

Notes
 "Kanye West" was formerly known as "Pop Man"

Personnel
Credits adapted from the mixtape's liner notes and Tidal.

Musicians

 Young Thug – vocals (all tracks), programming (2)
 TM88 – programming (1, 2, 4, 6)
 Supah Mario – programming (1)
 Billboard Hitmakers – programming (2, 5, 7, 8)
 Goose – programming (2)
 Wheezy – programming (2, 3, 6, 9)
 Cassius Jay – programming (6, 9)

Technical
 Young Thug – executive producer
 Joe LaPorta – mastering engineer
 Alexander Tumay – mixing engineer

Charts

Weekly charts

Year-end charts

References
Footnotes

Citations

Young Thug albums
2016 mixtape albums
Albums produced by TM88
Atlantic Records albums
Pop albums by American artists